With the Capitulation of Estonia and Livonia in 1710 the Swedish dominions Estonia and Livonia were integrated into the Russian Empire following their conquest during the Great Northern War. The Livonian nobility and the city of Riga capitulated on 4 July (O.S.) / 15 July 1710 (N.S.), Pernau (Pärnu) in August, and the Estonian nobility and the city of Reval (Tallinn) on 29 September (O.S.) / 10 October (N.S.). Russia left the local institutions in place and confirmed the traditional privileges of the German nobles and burghers as was established in Privilegium Sigismundi Augusti, especially with respect to the Protestant faith. The land reform of the so-called reduction which had been introduced by the Swedish king Charles XI, and transformed many serfs to subjects of the Crown, was reversed.

The Swedish Empire formally accepted the capitulations in the Treaty of Nystad in 1721. The transfer of the Baltic provinces marked the end of Sweden's and the beginning of Russia's time as a great power. The Baltic provinces retained their special status until the late 19th century.

Background

In the pretext of the Great Northern War, August the Strong of Saxe-Poland-Lithuania and Peter the Great of Russia had agreed to conquer and partition Sweden's Baltic dominions in the Treaty of Preobrazhenskoye in 1699. During the war, Charles XII of Sweden was able to defeat the Russian army at Narva in 1700, and then pursued August the Strong to Saxony. Once the main Swedish army was gone, Russian forces were able to regroup and conquered most of the plague-stricken Baltic provinces until 1710, when the last Swedish strongholds Riga, Reval and Pernau capitulated. At this time, the main Swedish army was captured at the Surrender at Perevolochna following the Battle of Poltava. Peter the Great had in person launched the first shells in the siege of Riga, in November 1709.

Terms

In the Estonian and Livonian capitulations, Russia largely confirmed local law and privileges, especially the Protestant church order, thus granting administrative, economical, social and cultural autonomy. This included laws and privileges dating back to the Teutonic Order State and, in Estonia, Danish laws. The reduction of these privileges by Swedish absolutism had caused exiled Livonian noble and spokesman of the Livonian nobles Johann Reinhold von Patkul to successfully lobby for war against Sweden in the pretext of the war, and their confirmation was to assure loyalty of the Baltic elites, who in the majority had fiercely resisted Russian conquest, to the tsar. The capitulations were concluded exclusively by the Baltic German burghers and noble class, the Estonian and Latvian speaking population was not mentioned.

The confirmation of local law and administration resulted in many Swedish laws and decrees remaining in effect under Russian rule. For example, an incomplete list of 122 still effective Swedish decrees was published in Reval in 1777, and the Swedish ecclesiastical order was only replaced in 1832. 

The capitulation of Livonia violated August the Strong's claims as outlined in the Treaty of Preobrazhenskoye (1699) and renewed on 9–10 October (O.S.) / 20–21 October 1709 (N.S.) in the Treaty of Thorn. When in these treaties the allies had partitioned the Swedish dominions among themselves, August was to gain Livonia. Ignoring Gerhard Johann von Löwenwolde's urge to heed these treaties, Boris Sheremetev had the Livonians swear allegiance to Peter the Great. Löwenwolde, formerly serving August the Strong, was made Peter's plenipotentiary in Livonia and held that office until 1713.

Consequences

Before the Swedish-Russian hostilities were concluded in Nystad (1721), the Swedish government did not accept the capitulation. Swedish intelligence operated in the occupied areas and interrogated people who escaped from these provinces to Sweden proper. In 1711 and 1712, Swedish naval units made several landfalls on the Estonian coast, burning villages and estates. Greater expeditions were planned during the same time, including a naval assault on Ösel (Saaremaa) in 1711 and a subsequent landfall with all Swedish troops stationed in Finland, but these plans were not executed. The last plan for a military recovery of the Baltic provinces was made in 1720, but this one too was not executed. The Swedish government further maintained an exiled administration of the Baltic dominions, and assigned vacant administrative positions until 1720. The Russian administration, under supreme command of Boris Sheremetev, reacted by prohibiting contacts of the local population to Sweden.

On 30 August 1721, the Treaty of Nystad formalized Russia's acquisition of the Baltic provinces and the respective capitulations in articles IX, X, XI and XII. Sweden had to relinquish her claims "forever", and strike the provinces from the royal title. Peter the Great in turn changed his title from tsar to imperator, and amended it with kniaz Estlandskyi, Livlandskyi i Korelskyi, i.e. duke of Estonia, Livonia and Karelia. However, reconquest of her former Baltic dominions remained a Swedish war aim in the century following the Great Northern War, since these territories were of high strategic importance and Livonia had been a major Swedish source for grain. Yet, none of the respective attempts during the Russo-Swedish wars of 1741–1743, 1788–1790 and 1808–1809 was successful. As Loit (2004) put it: "It was the acquisition of Estonia in the year of 1561, which marked the first step to Sweden's emergence as a European great power, and it was when the Baltic provinces were lost to Russia in 1710 (1721), during the Northern War, that Sweden was transformed into a second-class power again."

The acquisition of Estonia and Livonia introduced a new class of Baltic German nobles to Russian courts. During the following centuries, Baltic Germans were to occupy important positions in the Russian Empire. In 1795, Early Modern Russia completed her Baltic expansion with the acquisition of Courland by a capitulation similar to the Estonian and Livonian ones, following the Third Partition of the Polish-Lithuanian Commonwealth. The Baltic provinces retained their special status within the Russian Empire until tsar Nicholas I started to implement Russification policies in the 1840s. Between 1883 and 1905, under tsar Alexander III, nationalist policies resulted in changes in administration and education, before the 1905 Russian revolution eased the situation. While after the conquest of the Baltic provinces Peter the Great had guaranteed that the German language retained its status as official language, Catherine II had introduced Russian as second official language, and in the 1880s, Russian was introduced as the second lingua franca.

Notes

Sources

References

Bibliography

Great Northern War
1710 in law
18th century in Estonia
18th century in Latvia
Swedish Livonia
1710 in Russia
1710 in Sweden
Riga (1710)